Mehmet Avni Özgürel (born 1948, in Ankara) is a Turkish journalist, author and screenwriter. He was writing for the newspaper Radikal. According to Today's Zaman, he is "known for his close ties to Turkey's National Intelligence Organization". He has interviewed Murat Karayılan of the Kurdistan Workers' Party (PKK).

He is the screenwriter of the 2007 Turkish film Zincirbozan, on the 1980 Turkish coup d'état, Sultan Avrupa'da (2009), on Sultan Abdülaziz's 1867 trip to Europe; and of the 2010 Mahpeyker: Kösem Sultan, on Kösem Sultan. He is the screenwriter  and producer of 2014 Turkish film Darbe, on the February 7, 2012 Turkish intelligence crisis.

In 2013 he was appointed a member of the 63-member Committee of Wise Men convened to assist the Turkish-Kurdish solution process.

Books
 İşaret taşları (2001), Timas Publishing Group
 Cumhuriyet ve din (2003), Ufuk Kitapları
 Osmanlı'ya hasret topraklar (2005), Ufuk Yayınları
 Ayrılıkçı hareketler: Ziya Gökalp'in Kürt Dosyası ekiyle''' (2006), Altın Kitaplar
 Portreler galerisi : küllenen izler (2009), Etkileșim Yayınları
 Osmanlı'dan Cumhuriyet'e iktidar oyunu'' (2009), Etkileşim Yayınları

References

External links
 Özgürel at Radikal

1948 births
Living people
Turkish journalists
Radikal (newspaper) people
People from Ankara
Turkish male writers
Turkish male screenwriters